is a Japanese pop singer-songwriter and pianist.

On May 31, 2009, her contract with Sony ended.

Biography
Mai Hoshimura was born on April 18, 1981 in Matsue, Shimane. Hoshimura began to learn to play the piano at the age of four. Her mother, a teacher, had hoped she would become a classical pianist, but it was her father; also a teacher, who had influenced her with popular music. Her 2007 song "Sakura Biyori" was the tenth ending theme of the anime Bleach. Her single "Regret" was the seventh ending song of the anime D. Gray-man. Her song "Merry Go Round" was used as the fifth ending theme for the anime Yakitate!! Japan.

Discography

Albums

Best album 

 Piano & Best

Singles

References

External links 
  
  (Sony Music Entertainment) 
 Official blog 

1981 births
21st-century Japanese pianists
21st-century Japanese singers
21st-century Japanese women singers
Japanese women musicians
Japanese women pop singers
Japanese women singer-songwriters
Japanese singer-songwriters
Japanese pianists
Japanese women pianists
Living people
Musicians from Shimane Prefecture
People from Shimane Prefecture
Sony Music Entertainment Japan artists
21st-century women pianists